South Dakota Highway 1804 (SD 1804) is a  state highway in the U.S. state of South Dakota.

It consists of four disconnected segments. The southernmost segment is in the central part of Charles Mix County. It travels  from the shore of the Missouri River south of Geddes north to an intersection with SD 50 also south of Geddes. The second segment is in the northwestern part of Charles Mix County. It travels  from an intersection with 282nd Street southwest of Platte to an intersection with SD 44/SD 50 southeast of Academy. The third segment is in the central part of the state. It travels  from an intersection with US 14/US 83 in Pierre north to an intersection with 160th Street north-northeast of Forest City. The fourth segment, which is the longest segment, travels  from a continuation of 135th Street south-southeast of Glenham northward to the North Dakota state line. Here, it intersects 102nd Street and continues as ND 1804.

The segments from Pierre to US 212 and from Mobridge to the North Dakota state line are parts of the Lewis and Clark Trail. The number for SD 1804 and SD 1806 are numbered from the years of the Lewis and Clark Expedition.

The segment from Pierre to the Oahe Dam was previously SD 514 prior to 1975.

Route description

Charles Mix County
The southern segment of SD 1804 begins on the eastern shore of the Missouri River, a few miles south of Geddes. It travels just to the east of the Spring Creek and Pease Creek recreation areas, before crossing over Spring Creek. It curves to the northeast and reaches its northern terminus, an intersection with SD 50.

Southwest of Platte, SD 1804 resumes at an intersection with 282nd Street east of Platte Creek Recreation Area. At this intersection, the highway utilizes 359th Avenue and travels in a due-north direction. It skirts along the southeastern part of the Gray State Public Shooting Area. It curves to the northeast and travels through the southern part of that area, crossing over Platte Creek in the process. It curves to the southwest, paralleling the creek and then curves back to the north. The highway then travels on the west side of the shooting area. A few miles later, it meets its northern terminus, an intersection with SD 44/SD 50. At this intersection, 359th Avenue continues to the north.

Hughes, Sully, and Potter counties
SD 1804 resumes again in the northern part of Pierre, at an intersection with US 14/US 83. It curves to a northeastward direction and travels along the eastern edge of the Tailrace Recreation Area. On the northern edge of the recreation area is an intersection with the eastern terminus of SD 204. The highway then slips between the East Shore and Overlook recreation areas. The highway curves to the north and crosses over Spring Creek. SD 1804 then passes the Spring Creek Recreation Area and enters Sully County.

It passes the Okobojo Creek Recreation Area before it meets Onida Road and 284th Avenue. At an intersection with 291st Avenue, SD 1804 leaves Onida Road and turns left onto 291st Avenue. It travels on that road on a due-north direction. It curves back to the east for a short distance before encountering an intersection with 293rd Avenue and Agar Road. Here, the highway turns left onto 293rd Avenue and takes that road to the north. Approximately  later, it enters Potter County.

SD 1804 continues to the north and crosses over Artichoke Creek and then intersects US 212 just southeast of Forest City. At this intersection, SD 1804 turns right onto US 212 and begins a concurrency with that highway. Here, 293rd Avenue continues to the north. US 212 and SD 1804 briefly travel concurrently to the east-northeast. When SD 1804 splits off, it resumes its due-north direction. It curves to the north-northeast and then back to the north. At an intersection with 160th Street, this segment of SD 1804 ends, and 296th Avenue continues to the north.

Walworth and Campbell counties
SD 1804 resumes as a continuation of 135th Street south-southeast of Glenham, just west of 135th Street's intersection with 297th Avenue. It travels in a due-west direction. Just east of the Missouri River, it curves to the north. Here, it becomes known as 294th Avenue. It passes the Thomas Bay Recreation Area and proceeds to an intersection with 130th Street, which leads to Glenham. Here, SD 1804 turns left and proceeds in a due-west direction on 130th Street, while 294th Avenue continues straight ahead. It curves to the northwest and crosses over some railroad tracks of BNSF Railway. It then curve back to the north and has an intersection with US 12/SD 20. The three highways travel concurrently to the west and enter Mobridge, where SD 1804 splits off onto 4th Avenue East. It travels to the north, passing Legion Memorial Park, and then leaves the city limits of Mobridge. It then passes Mobridge Municipal Airport, Greenwood Cemetery, and Oahe Hills Country Club. The highway curves around the northwestern part of the country club, becomes known as 126th Street, and heads to the east. A short distance later, it turns to the left and resumes its northward direction, while 126th street continues straight ahead. SD 1804 begins to head to the north-northeast, before curving to the east-southeast and east. At an intersection with 122nd Avenue and 295th Avenue, the highway turns left and again resumes its northward path. It curves to a due-east direction and encounters an intersection with 119th and 297th streets. Here, SD 1804 travels to the north. It curves to the north-northwest and then back to the north. It passes to the east of the West Pollock Recreation Area and enters the southwestern part of Pollock. At an intersection with 103rd Street, it turns right onto Summit Road and travels to the east. In the south-central part of Pollock, SD 1804 turns left and almost immediately meets the western terminus of SD 10 (Main Street). It curves to the north-northwest, passes the West Pollock Recreation Area Camp Ground, and then leaves the city limits of Pollock. It skirts along the northwestern edge of Lake Pocasse. At an intersection with the southern terminus of 299th Avenue, SD 1804 turns left onto 102nd Street and travels to the west-northwest. The highway curves to the north-northwest and reaches its northern terminus, an intersection with 102nd Street at the North Dakota state line. Here, the roadway continues as ND 1804.

History

SD 1804, along with parts of SD 1806 and SD 204, were part of the original South Dakota Highway 514 (SD 514). The former SD 514 was removed when SD 1804 and SD 1806 were designated, and the remaining dam crossing portion of the highway was renumbered as SD 204 at that time. The section of highway between Pierre and Oahe Dam comprises SD 1804's portion.

Major intersections

See also

References

External links

The Unofficial South Dakota Highways Page: Highways 201+

1804
Transportation in Charles Mix County, South Dakota
Transportation in Hughes County, South Dakota
Transportation in Sully County, South Dakota
Transportation in Potter County, South Dakota
Transportation in Walworth County, South Dakota
Transportation in Campbell County, South Dakota
Pierre, South Dakota micropolitan area